Beckidia is a genus of European and African non-biting midges in the subfamily Chironominae of the bloodworm family Chironomidae.

Species
B. biraensis Zorina, 2006
B. connexa Zorina, 2006
B. hirsti (Freeman, 1957)
B. tethys (Townes, 1945)
B. zabolotzkyi (Goetghebuer, 1938)

References

Chironomidae
Nematocera genera